Cereus elegans is a cactus species in the genus Cereus.

See also
 Echinopsis chiloensis subsp. chiloensis

References

 Cereus on www.cactuslove.ru

elegans
Plants described in 1858